Annulohypoxylon, sometimes called cramp balls, is a genus of fungi in the family Xylariaceae. The 27 species in the genus have a collectively widespread distribution.

The genus Annulohypoxylon was created in 2005 and contains species formerly placed in the closely related genus Hypoxylon (it is equivalent to Hypoxylon section Annulata sensu). Fossils of Annulohypoxylon have been found in 12 million year old rocks from central England.

Use in the cultivation of Tremella fuciformis
Species in the genus Annulohypoxylon, especially Annulohypoxylon archeri, are commonly used in the cultivation of Tremella fuciformis, one of the foremost medicinal and culinary fungi of China and Taiwan.

Tremella fuciformis is a parasitic yeast that does not form an edible fruit body without parasitizing another fungus. The species Annulohypoxylon archeri is its preferred host, so cultivators usually pair cultures of Tremella fuciformis with this species, or others in the former genus Hypoxylon (now split into two genera – Hypoxylon and Annulohypoxylon).

Species

A. annulatum
A. apiahynu
A. archeri
A. atroroseum
A. austrobahiense
A. bahnphadengense
A. bovei
A. cohaerens
A. discophorum
A. elevatidiscum
A. gombakense
A. hemicarpum
A. hians
A. ilanense
A. leptascum
A. leucadendri
A. macrodiscum
A. maeteangense
A. michelianum
A. microcarpum
A. minutellum
A. moriforme
A. multiforme
A. nitens
A. nothofagi
A. orientale
A. pouceanum
A. pseudostipitatum
A. purpureonitens
A. purpureopigmentum
A. pyriforme
A. squamulosum
A. stygium
A. subeffusum
A. thouarsianum
A. truncatum
A. urceolatum

Gallery

References

External links

Ascomycota genera
Xylariales
Taxa described in 2005